K-BOB'S is a regional restaurant chain that operates in Texas, New Mexico, and formerly Colorado. The company was founded in 1966 in Clovis, New Mexico, by Gabe E. Parson. It filed for Chapter 11 bankruptcy in 1989 and emerged from in 1991 under the new ownership and management of Edward Tinsley III. Tinsley relocated the company headquarters from Dallas to Albuquerque, and then later to Santa Fe. In August 2015, Tinsley sold the company to a private equity fund founded by his son (Edward R. Tinsley IV) and son-in-law (Morgan Booth). Tinsley retained 4 stores in the New Mexico market as a franchisee. Today, Tinsley IV and Booth operate the company out of its current corporate headquarters in Houston.

References

External links

1966 establishments in New Mexico
Companies based in Santa Fe, New Mexico
Companies that filed for Chapter 11 bankruptcy in 1989
Economy of the Southwestern United States
Regional restaurant chains in the United States
Restaurant franchises
Restaurants established in 1966
Restaurants in New Mexico
Restaurants in Texas
Steakhouses in the United States